Andrea Zinsli (born 18 November 1972) is a Swiss former alpine skier who competed in the 1994 Winter Olympics.

Achievements

International competitions

Olympic games 
 1994 Winter Olympics: Alpine skiing, Lillehammer, 1994: ranking 11 Slalom

World Championships 
 FIS Alpine World Ski Championships 1996 Sierra Nevada 1996: ranking 4 Slalom

Worldcup 
 Season 1993/94: 17. ranking Slalom
 Season 1994/95: 18. ranking Slalom
 Season 1995/96: 15. ranking Slalom
 Season 1996/97: 19. ranking Slalom

World Junior Championships 
 Alpine World Junior Championships 1991 Hemsedal 1991: 3. ranking Slalom

National 
 Swiss Alpine Skiing championship 1994
 Swiss Alpine Skiing championship 1995
 Swiss Alpine Skiing championship 1997

External links
 sports-reference.com

1972 births
Living people
Swiss male alpine skiers
Olympic alpine skiers of Switzerland
Alpine skiers at the 1994 Winter Olympics